Braelon Allen (born January 20, 2004) is an American college football running back for the Wisconsin Badgers.

High school
Allen attended and played football at Fond du Lac High School, where he reclassified and graduated a year early.

College career

Allen was rated as a four-star recruit by ESPN, 247Sports.com, and Rivals.com. Allen committed to play football at the University of Wisconsin–Madison on July 14, 2020, the college's first commit for the 2022 class. On September 17, 2020, he announced he would be reclassifying to the 2021 recruiting class to enroll in college early. He was initially recruited as a defensive player, possibly linebacker or safety, before ultimately ending up at running back.

Allen played on special teams only for his first college game. After the team started the season at 1–3, Allen began to see some snaps along with starting tailback Chez Mellusi. Tailback redshirt freshman Jalen Berger left the team and three running backs transferred away from the college.  Allen had his first 100-yard rushing performance in the fifth game against Illinois. In early November, Mellusi had a season-ending injury as Allen was established as the team's starting running back. In the 2021 Las Vegas Bowl, Allen rushed for 159 yards and was named the Las Vegas Bowl MVP.

Statistics

Wisconsin Badgers records
 Most consecutive games with at least 100 rushing yards, freshman: 7 (2021)
 Longest rushing touchdown: 96 yards (2022)

References

Wisconsin Badgers football players
Living people
2004 births